Hypericum aethiopicum is a perennial herb in the genus Hypericum, in the section Adenosepalum. It is the type species of subsect. Aethiopicum.

References

aethiopicum